Stanley Leibel (born 21 March 1927) is a Canadian former sailor who competed in the 1968 Summer Olympics.

With the death of Canadian Olympian sailor David Howard at age 104 on January 21, 2023, Stanley Leibel became the oldest living Canadian summer Olympian at age 95.

References

1927 births
Living people
Canadian male sailors (sport)
Olympic sailors of Canada
Sailors at the 1968 Summer Olympics – 5.5 Metre
Place of birth missing (living people)